Chinmoku is the original title of:
 Silence (Endō novel), 1966 novel of historical fiction by Japanese author Shūsaku Endō
 Silence (1971 film), Japanese drama film directed by Masahiro Shinoda, based on the novel
 An opera by Teizo Matsumura, based on the novel
 "The Silence", a short story by Haruki Murakami, published in the 1991 collection The Elephant Vanishes
 "Silence", a 2007 episode of Death Note
 "Silence", a 2008 episode of D.Gray-man